Rabbit Lake is a small lake in Algoma District in Northeastern Ontario, Canada. It is part of the Great Lakes Basin and lies in geographic Hadley Township. The lake is the source of Rabbit Creek, which exits the lake at the northeast and which flows via the Montreal River to Lake Superior.

See also
List of lakes in Ontario

References

Other map sources:

Lakes of Algoma District